Laxman Singh Rajput (born 10 August  1992) is an Indian actor who appears in tv serials such as Savdhaan India and Jijaji Chhat Per Hain. He has shared the screen with Nawazuddin Siddiqui in Thackeray. He was later seen in Salman Khan's Bharat.

Television

Filmography

References

External links
 

1992 births
Indian male television actors
Living people
People from Rajasthan
Indian male actors
21st-century Indian actors